Inevitable may refer to:

 The Inevitable (album), a 1995 album by Squirrel Nut Zippers
 De Inevitable, a 2004 album by Koopsta Knicca
 Inevitable (album), a 2013 album by Samo
 Inevitable (Trey Songz EP), 2011
 Inevitable (Thud EP), 1993
 "Inevitable" (Dulce María song), 2010
 "Inevitable" (Shakira song), 1999
 "Inevitable", a song by Anberlin on their 2007 album Cities
 "Inevitable", a song by Lauren Daigle on her 2018 album Look Up Child
 "Inevitable", a song by Mushroomhead on their 1999 album M3
 "Inevitable", a song by Poo Bear on his 2018 album Poo Bear Presents Bearthday Music
 "Inevitable", a song by Scissor Sisters on their 2012 album Magic Hour
 Inevitable (book), a 1900 novel by Dutch author Louis Couperus
 The Inevitable, a 2016 nonfiction book about technology trends by US author Kevin Kelly
 Inevitable (Dungeons & Dragons), a magical construct in the Dungeons & Dragons role-playing game
 Al-Waqi'a,  "Inevitable", 56th Surah (Chapter) of the Quran